KidsQuest Children's Museum is a hands-on, interactive children's museum that encourages learning through play with an emphasis on science, technology, engineering, art and math (STEAM). Exhibits and programs are geared towards children 0-10 and their families. KidsQuest offers over 650 programs throughout the year including early learning classes, summer camps, drop-off and whole-family science workshops, free art programs and many special events including concerts and holiday programs. KidsQuest is a 501(c)(3) non-profit organization located in Bellevue, Washington. Exhibits and classes are intended to encourage cognitive, physical and emotional development through play.

History 
KidsQuest Children's Museum was conceived in 1997 in response to a survey in Eastside Parents Magazine identifying a children's museum as the "most needed facility or service" for the communities east of Lake Washington.

The museum opened on December 11, 2005, in the Marketplace @ Factoria in Bellevue and was designed to accommodate 60,000 visitors per year. As of 2014, the museum averages over 155,000 visitors per year, and has had over a million visitors since opening.

In January 2017, KidsQuest moved to a new location in Downtown Bellevue, at the former site of the Rosalie Whyel Museum of Doll Art.

References

External links 
 Official website
 
 
 

Museums in King County, Washington
Children's museums in Washington (state)
Buildings and structures in Bellevue, Washington